Radoslav Momirski (4 September 1919 – 12 February 2007) was a Serbian-born German football manager.

References

1919 births
2007 deaths
Serbian emigrants to Germany
German football managers
1. FC Saarbrücken managers
Wormatia Worms managers
Kickers Offenbach managers
SV Darmstadt 98 managers
VfL Osnabrück managers
SV Röchling Völklingen managers
FC 08 Homburg managers
Bayer 04 Leverkusen managers
VfL Wolfsburg managers
West German football managers